The Bach Sinfonia is an American musical ensemble based out of Washington D.C. that specializes in the performance of 18th-century music using historically informed performance practices. Founded in 1995 by music director Daniel Abraham, the ensemble consists of an orchestra reflecting the size and instrumentation of the baroque period as well as a number of vocal and instrumental soloists. The ensemble has been featured on National Public Radio's Performance Today and has recorded works by Johann Sebastian Bach and George Frideric Handel.

Sources
Biography at bach-cantatas.com

External links
Official Website of The Bach Sinfonia

Early music orchestras
American orchestras
Musical groups established in 1995
Bach music ensembles
1995 establishments in the United States
Performing arts in Washington, D.C.
Musical groups from Washington, D.C.